Sproatley is a village and civil parish in the East Riding of Yorkshire, England.

The village church, dedicated to St. Swithin, is said to contain a small chamber organ built by 'Father' Smith in the late 17th, early 18th century. The church was designated a Grade II listed building in 1987.

According to the 2011 UK census, Sproatley parish had a population of 1,350, a decrease on the 2001 UK census figure of 1,353.

Notable people
Chris Chilton (1943–2021) Hull City footballer, was born in Sproatley.

References
Notes

Bibliography

External links

Villages in the East Riding of Yorkshire
Holderness
Civil parishes in the East Riding of Yorkshire